Gulf Stream is a town in Palm Beach County, Florida, United States. The population was 786 at the 2010 census. Gulf Stream ranked as the eleventh highest-income place in the United States. As of 2018, the population recorded by the U.S. Census Bureau was 880.

History

Gulf Stream was founded in the 1920s as a planned community centered on the Gulf Stream County Club. The town takes its name from the Gulf Stream, a warm Atlantic Ocean current. Gulf Stream was incorporated in 1925. Gulf Stream School, a private co-educational school located in Gulf Stream, was founded in 1938. The school is open from Montessori 3s through to eighth grade.

Geography

Gulf Stream is located at  (26.490317, –80.061110).

Demographics

As of the census of 2000, there were 716 people, 340 households, and 222 families residing in the town. The racial makeup of the town was 95.39% White (93.2% were Non-Hispanic White,) 0.98% African American, 0.14% Native American, 1.40% Asian, 1.12% from other races, and 0.98% from two or more races. Hispanic or Latino of any race were 2.93% of the population.

There were 340 households, out of which 16.2% had children under the age of 18 living with them, 60.6% were married couples living together, 1.8% had a female householder with no husband present, and 34.7% were non-families. 28.8% of all households were made up of individuals, and 18.2% had someone living alone who was 65 years of age or older. The average household size was 2.11 and the average family size was 2.55.

In the town, the population was spread out, with 14.9% under the age of 18, 1.7% from 18 to 24, 15.6% from 25 to 44, 29.7% from 45 to 64, and 38.0% who were 65 years of age or older. The median age was 56 years. For every 100 females, there were 93.5 males. For every 100 females age 18 and over, there were 89.1 males.

The median income for a household in the town was $146,985, and the median income for a family was $186,777. Males had a median income of $78,045 versus $40,625 for females. The per capita income for the town was $133,651. About 2.5% of families and 2.5% of the population were below the poverty line, none under age 18 and just 1.7% of those age 65 or over.

As of 2000, English spoken as a first language accounted for 97.54% of all residents, while the mother tongue of Spanish made up 2.45% of the population.

Notable people

 Kevin Anderson, professional tennis player
 Andrew N. "Drew" Baur, co-owner, treasurer, and member of the board of directors of the St. Louis Cardinals (1996–Feb. 20, 2011)
 Robert Craft, conductor and musicologist
 Tomas Maier, fashion designer and creative director of Bottega Veneta
 Christopher O'Hare, artist and sculptor

References

External links
 The page for Gulf Stream at the Palm Beach County Convention and Visitors Bureau
 Home

Towns in Palm Beach County, Florida
Towns in Florida
Populated coastal places in Florida on the Atlantic Ocean